Elections to Brentwood Council were held on 4 May 2000.  One third of the council was up for election and the Liberal Democrat party kept overall control of the council.

After the election, the composition of the council was
Liberal Democrat 25
Conservative 10
Labour 2
Independent 1
Liberal 1

Election result

References
2000 Brentwood election result

2000
2000 English local elections
2000s in Essex